Wittlich Hauptbahnhof is a railway station for the town of Wittlich in the German state of Rhineland-Palatinate and is on the Koblenz–Trier line (Moselle line). Until the closure of the Wengerohr–Daun and Wengerohr–Bernkastel-Kues lines, it was a junction station and a regional rail node. Today it is the only station in Wittlich.

The station is located in the district of Wengerohr and the station was called Wengerohr station until 27 September 1987. The station has only five pairs of InterCity trains and one pair of Intercity-Express trains each day and is one of the smallest long-distance stations in Germany.

History 
The Moselle line from Koblenz to Trier was built between 1874 and 1879. Due to the extensive meandering of the middle Moselle, the line left the Moselle valley at Pünderich and was then built on a relatively straight route through the Wittlich Depression to Trier. Wengerohr station was opened on the line in the formerly independent town of Wengerohr when the Moselle line was built.

With the line away from the Moselle, many wine-growing towns were not connected to the rail network. Thus, in the following years, branch lines were built to some of these towns. In 1883, the branch line from Wengerohr station to Bernkastel-Kues was completed. This followed the course of the Lieser to meet the Moselle in the village of Lieser.

In order to connect Wittlich to the rail network, another branch line was built from Wengerohr station shortly later and opened on 11 April 1885 together with Wittlich station. This branch line was extended 25 years later to Daun. Even after the connection with the Eifel Cross Railway, the traffic on the southern section between Wengerohr and Wittlich was significantly greater than in the rest of the line.

The town of Wengerohr was incorporated as part of Wittlich on 7 June 1969; nevertheless the station was not renamed. Even after the closure of passenger services between Daun and Wittlich on 1 November 1981 and between Wengerohr and Bernkastel-Kues on 2 June 1984, the station retained its importance as a junction on the branch line from the Moselle line to Wittlich. On 27 September 1987, the station’s name was changed to Wittlich Hauptbahnhof, while the former Wittlich station was renamed Wittlich (Stadt) ("Wittlich (town)") station. The rest of the branch to Wittlich (Stadt) station was closed only a year later on 25 September 1988.

Current situation 
With the closure of the Wengerohr–Daun line, the stations of Wittlich (Stadt) and Wittlich-Grünewald were also closed. As a result, Wittlich Hauptbahnhof is the only station in the town of Wittlich, although the term Hauptbahnhof should only be used where a town has more than one station.

On 16 January 1995, a centralised traffic control centre at Wittlich station  was put into operation, remotely controlling several signal boxes.

Operations 
In long-distance passenger transport, the following Intercity-Express and InterCity services operate from the station:

In regional transport, several Regional-Express and Regionalbahn services stop in Wittlich:

On 12 December 2010 there was an increase of services to Wittlich station.
A new Regional-Express service runs from Wittlich to Trier and  Luxembourg and return, running twice daily. Thus, Wittlich is the terminus of a regional service for the first time.
In the morning peak a regional service runs from Cochem via Wittlich and Trier to Luxembourg and returns on the same route in the evening.
Furthermore, a new Regional-Express service operates on the Koblenz–Wittlich–Trier–Kaiserslautern route. It makes one return trip daily at noon.

Notes

Railway stations in Rhineland-Palatinate
Railway stations in Germany opened in 1879